An interlocutory injunction is a court order to compel or prevent a party from doing certain acts pending the final determination of the case.  It is an order made at an interim stage during the trial, and is usually issued to maintain the status quo until judgment can be made.

Jurisdictions

Australia
In Australia, the High Court in ABC v Lenah Game Meats stated that the purpose of the interlocutory injunction is to preserve identifiable legal or equitable rights. The basic proposition remains that where interlocutory injunctive relief is sought in a Judicature system court, it is necessary to identify the legal (which may be statutory) or equitable rights which are to be determined at trial and in respect of which there is sought final relief which may or may not be injunctive in nature.  In another Australian High Court decision, Castlemaine Tooheys Ltd v South Australia, Mason CJ outlined another requirement for establishing an interlocutory injunction.  He suggested that the plaintiff had to show that 'irreparable injury' would be suffered, for which common law damages would not be adequate compensation, unless an injunction was granted.  The main difficulty associated with granting an interlocutory injunction is that the court must consider whether the likelihood of a legal action being established is sufficiently strong for the injunction to be granted.

Canada 
The Federal Court of Canada has of recent years been reluctant to grant interlocutory injunctions, having set a high bar for the evidence of irreparable harm. In contrast, the Supreme Court of British Columbia, which has concurrent jurisdiction with the Federal Court of Canada on many issues taken a lower threshold test with respect to finding irreparable harm.

In Ontario, interlocutory injunctions are regulated by Rule 40 of the Ontario Rules of Civil Procedure.

See also
 Interlocutory
 Interlocutory appeal
 Interlocutor (disambiguation)

References

Common law legal terminology